Datong Coal Industry Co,. Ltd., established in 2001 and parented by Datong Coal Mining Group. It is engaged in excavating, processing and sales of coal. Its headquarters is in Datong City, the second largest city in Shanxi Province which has the greatest coal deposits in China.

It was listed on the Shanghai Stock Exchange in 2006.

See also

Coal power in China

References

External links
Datong Coal Industry Company Limited

Coal companies of China
Companies based in Shanxi
Companies owned by the provincial government of China
Energy companies established in 2001
Non-renewable resource companies established in 2001